Supraphon Music Publishing is a Czech record label, oriented mainly towards publishing classical music and popular music, with an emphasis on Czech and Slovak composers.

History 
The Supraphon name was first registered as a trademark in 1932. The name was used for the label of domestic albums produced for export by Ultraphon company. Post World War II Ultraphon was nationalized and changed its name to Gramofonové závody. In 1961 the name was changed to Gramofonové závody – Supraphon and later just to Supraphon in 1969.

In Czechoslovakia, it was one of the three major state-owned labels, the other two being Panton and Opus. Panton is currently a division of Supraphon; Opus (operating in Slovakia) became independent after break-up of Czechoslovakia and was acquired by Warner Music Group in 2019.

Catalogues 
The artistic direction of the firm gave rise to a broad catalogue of titles which systematically mapped out the works of Bedřich Smetana, Antonín Dvořák, Leoš Janáček, Bohuslav Martinů and Jan Dismas Zelenka, as well as other representatives of both the Czech and the international music worlds. Significant domestic and foreign soloists, chamber ensembles, orchestras and conductors all contributed to its collection of recordings.

Supraphon archives contain the recordings of Czech Philharmonic under the baton of Václav Talich, Karel Ančerl, Karel Šejna, Václav Neumann and others, as well as recordings of Saša Večtomov and such non-Czechoslovak artists as Sviatoslav Richter, Emil Gilels, Mstislav Rostropovich, Ida Haendel, Henryk Szeryng, Hélène Boschi or André Gertler. Many recordings have been reissued in editions Archive, Ančerl Gold Edition, Talich Special Edition.

The label also focused on collaboration with the present classical music interpreters, with recordings by the Pavel Haas Quartet awarded BBC Music Magazines "Chamber Choice". Among other artists working with Supraphon were Jiří Bělohlávek and Sir Charles Mackerras.

The company's first stereo records were issued in 1961, although  recordings were in the format from 1958. The label's earliest stereophonic pop music was recorded in 1964.

In the 1970s, Supraphon made some records in four channel stereo using the SQ system. For example: Two-LP-set Bedřich Smetana: Má Vlast. Czech Philharmonic Orchestra, Conductor: Václav Neumann. Supraphon Stereo/Quad  1410 2021/2 P 1976.

Since 1981, Supraphon was recording in digital and first CDs were produced in Japan in 1984. Supraphon started releasing popular music on CDs from 1987.

In 1988, Grammy nominated artists The Moody Brothers recorded an album in Prague with Jiří Brabec and Country Beat. The album Friends was the first such country music cooperative production between an American company, Lamon Records and Supraphon. The recording earned critical acclaim and won the Moodys and Brabec, along with the producers, engineers and studios involved in the project the Ampex Golden Reel Award.

As of January 2013, Supraphon is the official Czech distributor of Warner Music Group. However, the Czech branch of Warner Music revived after the company acquired EMI Czech Republic.

See also
 List of record labels

References

External links
 Supraphon – Official site
 Supraphonline – Online music store
 Supraphon Label - history and list of series
 

Czech record labels
Record labels established in 1932
Classical music record labels
Pop record labels
IFPI members
Czech brands
Companies of Czechoslovakia
State-owned record labels